CooperVision, Inc. is a business unit of The Cooper Companies, Inc.. It is a soft contact lens manufacturer. The company was founded in 1980, and it is headquartered in Pleasanton, CA. Its products are sold in over 100 countries.

CooperVision manufactures in Juana Díaz, Puerto Rico; Scottsville, New York; and Hamble and Southampton in Hampshire, England. It has major distribution centers in the U.K., U.S., and Belgium.

History
CooperVision's parent company, The Cooper Companies, Inc., started in 1958 as the Martin H. Smith Co. The company name changed to Cooper Laboratories, Inc. in 1967. In 1978, the company reorganized into Cooper Laboratories, Cooper Medical Devices, Cooper Dental, Cooper International, and CooperVision. CooperVision was incorporated in 1980. The company then went public in 1983. In 1987, CooperVision, Inc. changed its name to The Cooper Companies, Inc. and organized into three groups: Cooper Technicon, CooperSurgical, and CooperVision.

In 2004, CooperVision acquired Ocular Sciences, Inc., a global manufacturer and marketer of soft contact lenses. This acquisition helped the company become the third-largest soft contact lens manufacturer in the world. (Technically acquisition concluded on January 7, 2005)

In 2011, CooperVision announced its rebranding, developed by Siegel+Gale, a global branding firm.  In 2012, this rebrand was one of five companies to win the "Best of Awards" by REBRAND.

Also in 2011, CooperVision initiated a product recall on a limited number of lots of Avaira spherical and toric lenses. This was a result of identifying certain lots that did not meet the company's updated quality requirements.

In 2013, researchers from CooperVision, along with others from Linköping University, the University of Ottawa, FibroGen Inc., and Synsam Opticians participated in a study on the partial success of artificial corneas. This study was published in the Science Translational Medicine and reported on the BBC.

In August 2014, CooperVision completed the acquisition of Sauflon Pharmaceuticals Limited, a UK based manufacturer of daily disposable silicone based contact lenses.

Products
CooperVision develops, manufactures, and markets a range of contact lenses to a worldwide market. CooperVision produces both spherical contact lenses and specialty lens products in varying wearing and replacement schedules (i.e., how long a lens can be worn prior to removal and before it must be discarded).

America's Best, Walmart and Vision Source Private Label Contacts are manufactured by CooperVision.

References

External links
 

Contact lenses
Eyewear companies of the United States